The men's 102 kg competition at the 2019 World Weightlifting Championships was held on 25 September 2019.

The "world standards" were established by the International Weightlifting Federation as the minimum lifts that would be recognized as new world records after the prior world records were discarded in a reorganization of the weight categories. They have yet to be achieved in competition.

Schedule

Medalists

Records

Results

References

Results 

Men's 102 kg